Al qufl may refer to:

Al qufl, Hadhramaut, Yemen
Al qufl, San‘a’, Yemen